Shooting Star is the second extended play by American electronica project Owl City, released on iTunes and other media outlets on May 15, 2012, through Universal Republic. The extended play consists of four new songs that would also be on Young's subsequent album, The Midsummer Station. Mark Hoppus, vocalist for Blink-182 is featured on the song "Dementia".

Background

"I feel that as an artist you should never really look back or repeat yourself," Adam Young tells Billboard during an interview. Young is currently planning for a new album to be released in the summer of 2012 and Shooting Star "is just to help build excitement... for the [new] record coming out." His second extended play "is kind of a preview, and I wanted to make sure the four songs on the EP gave sort of an accurate snapshot or a taste of what the new record is about."

Writing and development
Though Young stays true to his synthpop roots, the EP illustrates his efforts to create a polished and radio-friendly sound, dabbling heavily with European trance in "Shooting Star" and rock on "Dementia".

Critical reception
Matt Collar of AllMusic stated, "Musically, Shooting Star features more of Owl City's signature synth and melodic pop-oriented songs.

Track listing
Track listing according to Amazon.com

Credits and personnel
Owl City
 Adam Young – vocals, keyboards, guitars, drums, producer, engineer, art direction, audio mixer
Additional musicians and production
Mikkel S. Eriksen - Additional instruments on Track 1, composer
Tor Erik Hermansen - Additional instruments on Track 1, composer
Josh Crosby - Additional instruments, backing vocals on Track 2, composer
Dustin Sauder - Guitar on Track 2
 Mark Hoppus – Additional vocals on Track 3
Kool Kojak - Additional instruments on Track 4
 Nate Campany – composer
 A.P. Grigg – composer
 Dan Omelio – composer
 Matthew Thiessen – composer
 Emily Wright – composer

Charts

Music videos

References

2012 EPs
Owl City albums